The 1998 Major League Soccer Supplemental Draft was held on February 1, 1998, at the Airport Hilton in Fort Lauderdale, Florida.

Format
Major League Soccer held a professional player combine in Fort Lauderdale the last week of January 1998.  On Saturday, January 31, 1998, the league held the first round of the 1998 MLS College Draft. The second and third rounds of the college draft concluded Sunday morning. On Sunday afternoon, February 1, 1998, the league held its supplemental draft.

Changes from 1997
 1998 expansion teams Chicago Fire and Miami Fusion were awarded the first and second selections in each round.

Round 1

Round 1 trades

Round 2

Round 2 trades

Round 3

Round 3 trades

Unresolved 1998 Supplemental Draft Trades
3 February 1997: Colorado Rapids acquired defender Peter Vermes and a third-round pick in the 1998 Supplemental Draft from New York/New Jersey MetroStars in exchange for midfielder Kerry Zavagnin and future considerations.
13 November 1997: San Jose Clash acquired a third-round selection in the 1998 Supplemental Draft from Miami Fusion in exchange for forward Christopher Sullivan. Sullivan retired two weeks later.

References

Major League Soccer drafts
Supplemental Draft
MLS Supplemental Draft
Soccer in Florida
Sports in Fort Lauderdale, Florida
Events in Fort Lauderdale, Florida
MLS Supplemental Draft